Viktoriya Vershynina (born 11 June 1971) is a retired Ukrainian long jumper.

Her personal best was 6.92 metres, achieved in July 1999 in Bila Tserkva. In the triple jump she has a personal best of 13.84 metres, from 1994.

Achievements

References

1971 births
Living people
Ukrainian female long jumpers
Athletes (track and field) at the 1996 Summer Olympics
Athletes (track and field) at the 2000 Summer Olympics
Olympic athletes of Ukraine
Universiade medalists in athletics (track and field)
Universiade gold medalists for Ukraine
Universiade silver medalists for Ukraine
Medalists at the 1995 Summer Universiade
Medalists at the 1997 Summer Universiade
Ukrainian people of Russian descent